The Battle of Mons Graupius was, according to Tacitus, a Roman military victory in what is now Scotland, taking place in AD 83 or, less probably, 84. The exact location of the battle is a matter of debate. Historians have long questioned some details of Tacitus's account of the fight, suggesting that he exaggerated Roman success.

Background 
Tacitus states that Gnaeus Julius Agricola, who was the Roman governor and Tacitus's father-in-law, had sent his fleet ahead to panic the Caledonians, and, with light infantry reinforced with British auxiliaries, reached the site, which he found occupied by the enemy.

Even though the Romans were outnumbered in their campaign against the tribes of Britain, they often had difficulties in getting their foes to face them in open battle. The Caledonii were the last unconquered British tribe (and were never fully subdued). After many years of avoiding the fight, the Caledonians were forced to join battle when the Romans marched on the main granaries of the Caledonians, just as they had been filled from the harvest. The Caledonians had no choice but to fight or starve over the next winter.

Location
The Battle of Mons Graupius has been a constant motif in the study of Roman Scotland. In the 19th century, it was identified with almost every principal Roman site in Perth and Kinross from Dalginross to Blairgowrie. With the advent of aerial photography and the interpretation of crop markings in the 20th century, the focus has moved to the north-east and a series of marching camps en route to the Moray coast. This has given rise to the belief that the battle occurred in Aberdeenshire at the foot of Bennachie, a very distinctive hill just south of a large marching camp at Logie Durno.

Considerable debate and analysis have been conducted regarding the battle location, with the locus of most of these sites spanning Perthshire to the north of the River Dee, all in the northeast of Scotland.  A number of authors have reckoned the battle to have occurred in the Grampian Mounth within sight of the North Sea. In particular, Roy, Surenne, Watt, Hogan and others have advanced notions that the high ground of the battle may have been Kempstone Hill, Megray Hill or other knolls near the Raedykes Roman Camp.

Those sites in Aberdeenshire fit the historical descriptions of Tacitus and have also yielded archaeological finds related to Roman presence. In addition, these points of high ground are proximate to the Elsick Mounth, an ancient trackway used by Romans and Caledonians for military manoeuvres. Bennachie in Aberdeenshire, the Gask Ridge not far from Perth, and Sutherland have also been suggested.

Historic Environment Scotland noted the uncertainty of the location as the reason for its exclusion from the Inventory of Historic Battlefields in Scotland.

Battle
According to Tacitus, 8,000 allied auxiliary infantry formed the centre, while 3,000 cavalry were on the flanks, with the Roman legionaries as a reserve in front of their camp. Estimates for the size of the Roman army range from 17,000 to 30,000; although Tacitus says that 11,000 auxiliaries were engaged, along with a further four squadrons of cavalry, the number of legionaries in reserve is uncertain. The Caledonian army, which Tacitus claims was led by Calgacus (but only mentions him as giving a speech, probably fictitious), was said to be over 30,000 strong. It was stationed mostly on higher ground; its front ranks were on the level ground, but the other ranks rose in tiers, up the slope of the hill in a horseshoe formation. The Caledonian chariotry charged about on the level plain between the two armies.

After a brief exchange of missiles, Agricola ordered auxiliaries to launch a frontal attack on the enemy. These were based around four cohorts of Batavians and two cohorts of Tungri swordsmen. The Caledonians were cut down and trampled on the lower slopes of the hill. Those at the top attempted an outflanking movement but were themselves outflanked by Roman cavalry. The Caledonians were then comprehensively routed and fled for the shelter of nearby woodland, but were relentlessly pursued by well-organised Roman units.

It is said that the Roman Legions took no part in the battle, being held in reserve throughout. According to Tacitus, 10,000 Caledonian people died at a cost of only 360 auxiliary troops. 20,000 Caledonians retreated into the woods, where they fared considerably better against pursuing forces. Roman scouts were unable to locate the remaining Caledonian forces the next morning.

Criticisms of Tacitus's account
The decisive victory reported by Tacitus has been criticized by some historians, however, who believe no engagement occurred. One author has suggested that the emperor Domitian may have been informed of the fraudulence of Agricola's claims to have won a significant victory. Despite these claims, Agricola was awarded triumphal honours and was offered another governorship in a different part of the empire, so it would seem unlikely Domitian doubted he had achieved substantial successes. Suggestions that he invented the entire episode and was thereafter shunned by the emperor do not seem likely, given that he was awarded honours on his return.

Aftermath
Following this final battle, it was proclaimed that Agricola had finally subdued all the tribes of Britain. Soon afterwards he was recalled to Rome, and his post passed to Sallustius Lucullus. It is likely that Rome intended to continue the conflict, but that military requirements elsewhere in the empire necessitated a troop withdrawal and the opportunity was lost.

Tacitus' statement in his account of Roman history between 68 AD and 98 AD: Perdomita Britannia et statim missa (Britain was completely conquered and immediately let go), denotes his bitter disapproval of Domitian's failure to unify the whole island under Roman rule after Agricola's successful campaign.

See also
 Scotland during the Roman Empire

References

Further reading
James E. Fraser, The Roman Conquest Of Scotland: The Battle Of Mons Graupius AD 84
Duncan B. Campbell, Mons Graupius AD 83, Oxford: Osprey Publishing, 2010.
A.J. Woodman (with C. Kraus), Tacitus: Agricola, Cambridge: Cambridge University Press, 2014.
Duncan B. Campbell, 'A note on the Battle of Mons Graupius', Classical Quarterly 65 (2015), pp. 407–410.

External links
 Agricola: He came, he saw, but did he conquer?
 An essay by James Grout in Encyclopaedia Romana
 Ptolemy's Victoria and the battle of Mons Graupius

1st-century battles
Battles involving the Roman Empire
Battles involving the Picts
Flavian military campaigns
History of the Scottish Highlands
Military history of Roman Britain
Scotland in the Roman era
1st century in Scotland
80s in the Roman Empire
80s conflicts